is a 2022 Japanese anthology streaming television drama series based on Mitsuru Adachi's manga collection with the same name starring members of boy band JO1 as the male protagonists. The series is produced by Atmovie Inc. and Lapone Entertainment, with Yoshimoto Kogyo as the distributor. It was premiered on Amazon Prime Video in Japan on March 1, 2022. "Dreamer" by JO1 served as the ending theme for the series.

Premise
Short Program follows eleven members of boy band JO1 alternately playing the male protagonist in each episode, based on the short stories on youth and romance from Mitsuru Adachi's manga collection with the same name. Each story centers on different theme or activity, such as sports, music, or detective story. The series concluded with an original story written by Yusuke Moriguchi, featuring all male protagonists from the previous episodes.

Cast and characters

Main  

JO1
 Takumi Kawanishi as Ichirō Imai
 Shion Tsurubo as Kenji Uehara
 Shosei Ohira as Kōhei Shinjō
 Ren Kawashiri as Kazuhiko Sugii
 Sho Yonashiro as Haruhiko Takechi
 Sukai Kinjo as Misaki Tadokoro
 Syoya Kimata as Keiichi Kataoka
 Keigo Sato as Shōhei Tahara
 Ruki Shiroiwa as Seiya Toda
 Issei Mamehara as Hajime Toshino
 Junki Kono as Wataru Matsumura

Female protagonists
 Natsumi Okamoto as Chisato Ichinose
  as Tomomi Sakamoto
 Honoka Yahagi as Nao Tanimura
 Asuka Kijima as Asako Takazawa
 Nashiko Momotsuki as Misato Yamane
  as Wakaba Moriyama
 Fumika Baba as Michiko
  as Naomi Morimura
  as Satomi Nishijima
  as Manami Nonomura
 Sakurako Konishi as Keiko Komiya
 Marika Itō as Miho

Supporting 
  as Sugimoto
 Itsuji Itao as  Ichirō's father
 Takurō Osada as Haruki Kitayama
  as Sayaka
 Junya Ikeda as Tomio Akahori
  as waitress. She accompanied Kōhei finishing his script.
 Koji Abe as shopkeeper. He received posters from Kōhei and Nao.
  as Toshio Higashi
  as Hinata, Kazuhiko's girlfriend
  as Mr. Yamane, Misato's older brother
  as Katsuaki Sugiyama
  as Yuki
  as Detective Moriyama
 Noboru Kaneko as Mr. Komiyama, Wakaba's boss
  as Shin
 Ami Inoha as Akane
  as Mr. Ōba, Seiya and Ken's boss
  as Haruko Tsuyama
  as Ken Takasugi
 Katsuya as Mr. Tanabe, lodge owner
 Louis Kurihara as an actor, who claims to be an alien.
 Tomoki Hirose as Kakimoto, who claims to be a YouTuber.
  as a detective
 Mariko Tsutsui as Mayumi, Keiko's aunt and boss
  as a police
  as a beach house visitor
 Zen Kajihara as the CEO of Project 101

Episodes

Production

Development
On December 12, 2021, it was announced that the Japanese boy band JO1 would release their first drama Short Program. Takeshi Moriya, known for Midnight Swan and the 2020 remake of Tokyo Love Story, was announced as one of the producers. The production companies involved in the series were Atmovie Inc. and Lapone Entertainment, while Yoshimoto Kogyo acted as the distributor. Ryohei Watanabe, Takeo Kikuchi, Naho Kamimura, Tetsuhiko Tsuchiya, Takashi Masuyama, and Takeshi Moriya were appointed to direct the episodes. Each director and scriptwriter decided which episode they would take based on what they had discussed together. The principal photography took place from Summer to Fall 2021.

Casting
With nearly all members of JO1 being inexperienced in acting, the production was preceded by a series of acting workshops before the directors decided roles for each member. On February 14, 2022, the list of leading roles and titles of each episode was announced. Natsumi Okamoto, Honoka Yahagi, Sakurako Konishi and others were announced to play the female protagonists the next day. Itsuji Itao and other supporting casts were announced on February 22. Former member of Nogizaka46 Marika Itō was announced to play the female protagonist of the surprise last episode released on March 14, 2022.

Music
The opening theme song is composed by Yoshitaka Fujimoto. The ending theme song for the series titled "Dreamer" by JO1 was released digitally on February 14, 2022. Its music video featuring scenes from the series was released the next day.

Release
The first three episodes of Short Program were released on Amazon Prime Video in Japan on March 1, 2022, at 5 p.m Japan Standard Time (UTC+09:00). The premiere was accompanied by the release of Produce 101 Japan director's cut version. The subsequent episodes were released within 2–3 days interval with the final two episodes released on March 9, 2022. A surprise 12th episode was later announced on March 14, 2022 and released on the same date at 5 p.m JST.

Reception

Critical response 
Shin, in particular, was impressed by Shion Tsurubo's ability in "creating an atmosphere" in "Spring Passes", stating "although the slight intonation of the Kansai dialect remained in his voice, it did not bother him as his facial expressions spoke more than his words". Sakai called Ren Kawashiri's casting in "The Current State of Affairs" as "apt" since he was "able to transfer the sharpness he had acquired through dancing into his acting, and to carry Sugii's feelings in each of his move." Yoshida praised Keigo Sato's performance in "Blowing Any Which Way" and felt that "even though Sato is playing the opposite of himself, he is able to give a performance that will move the hearts of those who are watching". Meanwhile, Sakai applauded Syoya Kimata for using his personality in "What's Going On!?" by saying "while some actors tend to erase their own personalities and get into their roles, Kimata is the type of actor who does the opposite. In this episode, he used his own charm in his performance and 'possessed' the character even more". Shin later praised Mamehara Issei's expressive eyes in "Memory Off", saying "his large eyes clearly reflect a wide range of emotions: dismay, interest, worry, relief, determination, hesitation, and so on".

The writers also commented on the production side of the series. Yoshida praised "the bold rearrangement" the production team took with "At the Intersection" and wrote "the episode also shows the excitement, confusion, and fantasy of the person Haruhiko sees every day, as well as the feelings from the female protagonist's side, making us want to root for them even more. In such a short period of time, each character is portrayed well". Sakai praised the direction by Takashi Masuyama in "What's Going On!?" despite "the rapidly changing circumstances" in the episode. She also praised "the nostalgic and dramatic feel" created by the combination of images and the music score by Yoshitaka Fujimoto in "A Stop on the Way".

References

External links 
 Official website (in Japanese)
 

2022 Japanese television series debuts
2020s high school television series
2020s teen drama television series
Amazon Prime Video original programming
Japanese anthology television series
Japanese drama television series
Japanese high school television series
Japanese romance television series
Japanese television dramas based on manga
Television shows filmed in Japan
JO1